Léon Balcer,  (October 13, 1917 – March 22, 1991) was a Canadian politician.

He was born in Trois-Rivières, Quebec and was a lawyer by profession.

Member of the House of Commons
He was one of only three Progressive Conservative (or PC) candidates who were elected to the House of Commons in 1949 from Quebec, representing the district of Trois-Rivières. He was re-elected in the elections of 1953, 1957, 1958, 1962, and 1963. He sat with the Government of Canada from 1957 to 1963 and with Official Opposition from 1949 to 1957 and 1963 to 1965.

Balcer held numerous ministerial positions in the cabinet of Prime Minister John Diefenbaker, including Solicitor General of Canada (1957–1960), and Minister of Transport (1960–1963). He also briefly acted as Minister of Mines and Technical Surveys (Acting), and Secretary of State of Canada (Acting).

During John Diefenbaker's leadership of the Progressive Conservative Party, Balcer was his Quebec lieutenant and Deputy Leader of the PC Party.

A few months before the 1965 election, he left his party and sat as an independent, saying, "there is no place for a French Canadian in the party of Mr. Diefenbaker." In 1964, he had led a small group of PC MPs who broke with Diefenbaker and supported a new flag of Canada during the flag debate championed by the Liberal prime minister, Lester B. Pearson. He did not run for re-election in that year.

Provincial politics
Balcer ran as a Liberal candidate in the district of Trois-Rivières in 1966, but lost to Union Nationale incumbent Yves Gabias.

Death
Balcer died on March 22, 1991.

Archives
There is a Léon Balcer fonds at Library and Archives Canada.

Footnotes

External links
 
Léon Balcer at The Canadian Encyclopedia

1917 births
1991 deaths
Members of the House of Commons of Canada from Quebec
Members of the King's Privy Council for Canada
Progressive Conservative Party of Canada MPs
Quebec lieutenants
People from Trois-Rivières
Canadian Ministers of Transport
Solicitors General of Canada